The women's 400 metres hurdles event at the 1997 Summer Universiade was held on 28 and 29 August at the Stadio Cibali in Catania, Italy.

Medalists

Results

Heats

Final

References

IAAF 1997 ranking

Athletics at the 1997 Summer Universiade
1997 in women's athletics
1997